Rear Admiral Stephen Mark Richard Moorhouse,  (born 5 February 1973) is a Royal Navy officer who currently serves as Director of Force Generation at Navy Command.

Naval career
Moorhouse joined the Royal Navy on 18 September 1991. After qualifying as an airborne early warning specialist, he became successively commanding officer of the offshore patrol vessel, the offshore patrol vessel, and the frigate, . He went on to command the landing platform helicopter,  and then, from September 2018, the aircraft carrier, .

Moorhouse became Commander United Kingdom Carrier Strike Group in December 2019, which role included leading the United Kingdom Carrier Strike Group 21 deployment to the Far East and a tour as commander of Combined Task Force 150; he then became Director of Force Generation in January 2022.

Moorhouse was appointed an Officer of the Order of the British Empire (OBE) in the 2015 New Year Honours, and promoted to Commander of the same order (CBE) in Operational Honours on 25 November 2022.

References

Living people
1973 births
Commanders of the Order of the British Empire
Royal Navy personnel of the Iraq War
Royal Navy personnel of the War in Afghanistan (2001–2021)
Royal Navy rear admirals